Larisa Kositsyna (born 14 December 1963) is a retired Soviet high jumper. She competed in both the 1983 and 1987 World Championships in Athletics - Women's high jump.

Her personal best jump was 2.00 metres, achieved in July 1988 in Chelyabinsk.

Achievements

References

1963 births
Living people
Soviet female high jumpers
World Athletics Championships athletes for the Soviet Union